In mathematics, specifically in functional analysis and order theory, a topological vector lattice is a Hausdorff topological vector space (TVS)  that has a partial order  making it into vector lattice that is possesses a neighborhood base at the origin consisting of solid sets. 
Ordered vector lattices have important applications in spectral theory.

Definition 

If  is a vector lattice then by the vector lattice operations we mean the following maps:
If  is a TVS over the reals and a vector lattice, then  is locally solid if and only if (1) its positive cone is a normal cone, and (2) the vector lattice operations are continuous. 

If  is a vector lattice and an ordered topological vector space that is a Fréchet space in which the positive cone is a normal cone, then the lattice operations are continuous. 

If  is a topological vector space (TVS) and an ordered vector space then  is called locally solid if  possesses a neighborhood base at the origin consisting of solid sets. 
A topological vector lattice is a Hausdorff TVS  that has a partial order  making it into vector lattice that is locally solid.

Properties 

Every topological vector lattice has a closed positive cone and is thus an ordered topological vector space. 
Then the topological vector lattice's positive cone  is a strict -cone, where  is a strict -cone means that  is a fundamental subfamily of  that is, every  is contained as a subset of some element of ). 

Examples 

The Banach spaces  are Banach lattices under their canonical orderings. 

See also

References

Bibliography

  
  

Functional analysis